Muirabad is a neighborhood of Allahabad, Uttar Pradesh, India.

Neighbourhoods in Allahabad